The Ministry of Information Technology of West Bengal is a Bengal government ministry. It is a ministry mainly responsible for creating conducive environment for rapid development in IT sector. The objective of the Department is to shape a digital future for West Bengal.

Ministerial Team 
The ministerial team is headed by the Cabinet Minister for Information Technology, who may or may not be supported by Ministers of State. Civil servants are assigned to them to manage the ministers' office and ministry. Government of West Bengal set up IT task Force in March 1999. Based on the recommendation of the Task Force, the State declared IT Policy in January 2000 and set up an independent IT Department in August 2000 with a mandate to create conducive environment for rapid development in IT sector. The objective of the Department is to "Shape a Digital Future for West Bengal".

References 

Science and technology in West Bengal
Government departments of West Bengal